Monster Math Squad is a Canadian CGI animated series, created by Jeff Rosen and produced by DHX Media for CBC Television. It follows the adventures of three monsters who go on missions that require math equations. Together, they solve math problems to complete missions.

Plot 
The series takes place in the city of Monstertopia, where all sorts of monsters live. Three monsters named Max, Lily, and Goo are always ready to help their friends, solving math problems and learning math equations.

Studio 
Editor: Johanna Benson
Makers: Garyan Lillian, Tanya Schott

Characters

Main 
Max (voiced by Cory Doran) is a yellow monster with a horn and orange hands, feet and lips and green eyes. Max is the biggest and strongest of the squad, and is best friends with Goo, with whom he likes playing games with. The two also share favorite foods, and Max is usually depicted as the monster in charge.
Lily (voiced by Julie Sype) is a pink cycloptic monster with a blue eye, purple back spines and a yellow bow. She is the only female member of the Monster Math Squad, and is their smartest member. Lily can often be seen keeping and eye on Max and Goo when not solving problems.
Goo (voiced by Annick Obonsawin) is a green gelatinous monster with three purple eyes. He is the smallest of the squad, and is best friends with Max, with whom he likes playing games with. The two also share favorite foods, and Goo is usually portrayed as an eager junior member. He is always surprised by the Scream Screen.
Monster Math Monitors are a trio of robots with screens for mouths. The monitors are: a hockey player, a ballerina and a motorcycle.

Others 
Miss Cake Monster is a one-eyed monster who loves making cakes and other sweet foods.
Mr. Cranky Pants is a blue monster wearing a green shirt and brown pants. He is always seen with a cranky and grouchy personality.
Woofie is a turquoise monster which behaves like a dog. He often goes crazy and flees away from the Monster Math Squad.
Smooth Moves Monster is a purple monster wearing casual clothes. He gives Monster Math Squad some hints in their missions.
Mess Monster is a sphere-shaped monster with two horns on its head. It loves causing mess in wherever places it is in.
Falls Apart Monster is a monster made of a purple, square-shaped body, two round eyes, a oval mouth, blue limbs and a triangular horn. He can fall apart like Mr. Potato Head.
Delivery Monster is a big, rhinoceros-like monster with yellow, stubby wings on his back. He is a delivery man who delivers gifts to other monsters.

External links

CBC Television original programming
Mathematics education television series
Canadian children's animated adventure television series
Canadian children's animated fantasy television series
2010s Canadian animated television series
2012 Canadian television series debuts
2016 Canadian television series endings
Canadian computer-animated television series
Animated television series about monsters
Television series by DHX Media
Canadian preschool education television series
Animated preschool education television series
2010s preschool education television series
English-language television shows